Robert Bobroczkyi, alternatively anglicized as Robert Bobroczky and originally Róbert Bobróczky in Hungarian (born 17 July 2000), is a Romanian college basketball player of Hungarian descent. Standing , he has drawn attention for his exceptional height. After moving to the United States in 2016 and attending high school in Geneva, Ohio, he attended and played for Rochester University in Rochester Hills, Michigan, through the 2021–2022 season.

Early life 
As such, he was taller than Robert Wadlow was from the ages 8 to 13 years. He has been the subject of medical studies nearly his entire life, leading to the prevailing opinion that his height is a result of healthy genetics (i.e. familial or constitutional tall stature), not a hormonal disease or overgrowth syndrome.

Career

Youth 
In 2014, Bobróczky was recruited by A.S. Stella Azzurra, an amateur-level basketball club based in Italy that produced NBA power forward Andrea Bargnani. A scouting report on him noted that Bobróczky possessed an improved midrange jumper and passing ability, and his physical attributes made him an obvious mismatch against any of his opponents. Like most players of his stature however, Bobróczky was limited by his lack of muscle mass, endurance, and mobility on the court. His tremendously awkward gait and threat of exhaustion forced Bobróczky to play limited minutes after helping the team win its under-15 championship title. Despite his limitations, Bobróczky became an internet sensation in early 2016, as videos surfaced of him dominating much shorter competition during a game with Stella Azzurra.

High school 
In 2016, Bobróczky moved to Geneva, Ohio, in the United States to attend the college-preparatory school SPIRE Institute and Academy. Entering his freshman season, Bobróczky was put on a minutes restriction as he attempted to bulk up his physique for a transition into faster, more physical American basketball. On January 14, 2017, Bobróczky made his debut for SPIRE Institute.  he was attending the nearby Grand River Academy.

In July 2020, Bobróczky committed to Rochester University, which spelled his surname as "Bobroczkyi" on their roster.

College 
He returned to Romania shortly after classes began due to the COVID-19 pandemic in fall 2020 but returned in fall 2021, again with the spelling "Bobroczkyi" on the Warrior roster.

Personal life 
As a high school senior, Bobróczky wore US size 17 shoes and had a  inseam.

Bobróczky speaks Romanian, Hungarian, English, Serbian, and Italian.

See also
 Gheorghe Mureșan
 Gogea Mitu
 List of tallest people

References 

2000 births
Living people
Romanian men's basketball players
Centers (basketball)
Romanian expatriate sportspeople in Italy
Romanian expatriate sportspeople in the United States
Romanian sportspeople of Hungarian descent
Sportspeople from Arad, Romania